Gaddaar (English: The Traitor) is a 1973 Hindi language film. It stars Vinod Khanna in lead role and the supporting casts include Yogeeta Bali, Pran, Ranjeet, Madan Puri, Iftekhar, Manmohan, Ram Mohan, Anwar Hussain and Satyen Kappu. The music was provided by Laxmikant-Pyarelal. It was a successful film on its release. The film was produced and directed by Harmesh Malhotra.

Cast
 Vinod Khanna as CBI Inspector Raj Kumar "Raja"
 Yogeeta Bali as Reshma
 Pran as B. K.
 Ranjeet as Babu
 Madan Puri as Kanhaiya
 Iftekhar as Professor 
 Manmohan as Mohan 
 Ram Mohan as John
 Anwar Hussain as Sampat
 Satyen Kappu as Dr. Mathur

Soundtrack
The music was composed by Laxmikant-Pyarelal. The opening credit sequence features a theme which is a direct copy of main theme of Sergio Leone's classic For a Few Dollars More, composed by Ennio Morricone.

External links

1973 films
1970s Hindi-language films
Films directed by Harmesh Malhotra